Rammo is a surname. Notable people with the surname include:

Karl-Martin Rammo (born 1989), Estonian sailor
Leida Rammo (1924–2020), Estonian actress and theatre director
Willi Rammo (1925–2009), German boxer

See also
Ramm

Estonian-language surnames